Graham Winyard CBE FRCP FFPH (born January 1947) is a public health physician who was medical director of the National Health Service in England from 1993 to 1999 and deputy chief medical officer of the NHS in England. He is a member of Health Professionals for Assisted Dying. He is an associate of Hertford College, University of Oxford.

Early life
Graham Winyard was born in January 1947. He was educated at a grammar school and was the first of his family to attend university. He studied medicine at Hertford College, University of Oxford, and at the Middlesex Hospital.

Career
Winyard practiced as a public health physician and was medical director of the National Health Service in England from 1993 to 1999 and deputy chief medical officer of the NHS in England.

He is a fellow of the Royal College of Physicians and a fellow of the Faculty of Public Health.

Other activities
Winyard took a master's degree in religion at SOAS. He has converted to Buddhism and is a lay treasurer of a Theravada forest monastery in West Sussex.
 
He is a member of Health Professionals for Assisted Dying.

He is an associate of Hertford College, University of Oxford.

Winyard was appointed Commander of the Order of British Empire.

References 

Living people
1947 births
20th-century British medical doctors
British public health doctors
Commanders of the Order of the British Empire
Fellows of the Royal College of Physicians
Fellows of the Faculty of Public Health
National Health Service people
Physicians of the Middlesex Hospital
Alumni of Hertford College, Oxford
British Buddhists
21st-century British medical doctors